Izatha taingo (Māori name pepepepe tāingo o Ngāti Kuri) is a species of moth in the family Oecophoridae. It is endemic to New Zealand. This species is classified as "At Risk, Naturally Uncommon" by the Department of Conservation. It is only known from the Aupouri Peninsula of Northland.

Taxonomy and etymology 
This species was described by Robert J. B. Hoare in 2010. The epithet is based on the Māori word tāingo means "speckled" or "mottled" and refers to the forewing pattern. The holotype specimen is held at the New Zealand Arthropod Collection.

Description 
The wingspan is 18.5–22.5 mm for males and about 16 mm for females. I. taingo is normally white or pale whitish green in colour. This species is visually very similar to Izatha peroneanella. The only distinguishing feature between these two species is the difference in the male genitalia.

Distribution 
This species is endemic to New Zealand. It has only been found on the Aupouri Peninsular of Northland.

Biology and behaviour 
Adult moths have been recorded on the wing in October, November and December.

Conservation Status 
This species has been classified as having the "At Risk, Naturally Uncommon" conservation status under the New Zealand Threat Classification System.

References

Oecophorinae
Moths described in 2010
Moths of New Zealand
Endemic fauna of New Zealand
Endangered biota of New Zealand
Endemic moths of New Zealand